Kate Stanton (born 8 October 1998) is an Australian rules footballer who played for the Greater Western Sydney Giants in the AFL Women's competition. Stanton was drafted by Greater Western Sydney with their fifth selection and thirty-third overall in the 2016 AFL Women's draft. She played four matches in her debut season and kicked one goal. She was delisted at the end of the 2017 season.

References

External links 

1998 births
Living people
Greater Western Sydney Giants (AFLW) players
Australian rules footballers from New South Wales